Taner Üstündağ (born 28 October 1971) is a Turkish alpine skier. He competed in three events at the 1992 Winter Olympics.

References

1971 births
Living people
Turkish male alpine skiers
Olympic alpine skiers of Turkey
Alpine skiers at the 1992 Winter Olympics
Place of birth missing (living people)
20th-century Turkish people